This article lists the colonial residents of Rwanda, during the time when modern-day Rwanda was part of German East Africa and Ruanda-Urundi.

List

(Dates in italics indicate de facto continuation of office)

See also
 List of colonial governors of Ruanda-Urundi
 List of colonial residents of Burundi

External links
 World Statesmen – Rwanda

Rwanda, Colonial residents of
Colonial residents
Colonial residents